Freiberg disease, also known as a Freiberg infraction, is a form of avascular necrosis in the metatarsal bone of the foot. It generally develops in the second metatarsal, but can occur in any metatarsal. Physical stress causes multiple tiny fractures where the middle of the metatarsal meets the growth plate. These fractures impair blood flow to the end of the metatarsal resulting in the death of bone cells (osteonecrosis). It is an uncommon condition, occurring most often in young women, athletes, and those with abnormally long metatarsals. Approximately 80% of those diagnosed are women.

Initial treatment is generally 4–6 weeks of limited activity, often with crutches or orthotics. In rare cases, surgery is necessary to reduce the bone mass of the metatarsal.

The condition was first described by Alfred H. Freiberg in 1914. He initially thought the condition was caused by acute physical trauma, which is why it was initially called an infraction.

References

External links 

Osteonecrosis